The 1947 AAFC season was the second season of the All-America Football Conference. The league included eight teams, broken up into Eastern and Western divisions, which played a 14-game official schedule, culminating in a league Championship Game.

After the end of the previous season, the Miami Seahawks were $350,000 in debt, with owner Harvey Hester being declared bankrupt, and leaving the AAFC with no option to shut down the franchise. They would be replaced in the Eastern division by the Baltimore Colts. The Buffalo Bisons also chose to rebrand their franchise, holding a contest to determine the new name: the winner requested the new name to be the Buffalo Bills, named after "Buffalo Bill" Cody.

Draft

The league's first collegiate draft was held on December 20–21, 1946 in Cleveland, Ohio. Ernie Case was the first overall selection.

Regular season

Week One
The 1947 regular season of the All-America Football Conference kicked off on Friday, August 29 with a game between the Los Angeles Dons and the Chicago Rockets. The game was attended by 41,812 people, only about 70% of that of last season. Former Washington Redskins coach Dudley DeGroot was able to pull off a victory against the Rockets with a score of 24–21.

The week continued with two games on Sunday, August 31, with the San Francisco 49ers beating the Brooklyn Dodgers 23–7, in front of 31,874 people at Kezar Stadium, and the Buffalo Bills beating the New York Yankees 28–24, in front of 32,385 people.

1947 AAFC final standings
W = Wins, L = Losses, T = Ties, Pct. = Winning Percentage
PF = Points Scored For, PA = Point Scored Against

Championship game

AAFC Championship: Cleveland 14, New York 3 (December 14 @ New York)

Footnotes